The pitta-like ground roller (Atelornis pittoides) is a species of bird in the ground roller family Brachypteraciidae. The species is monotypic, having no subspecies. It is endemic to Madagascar.

The species was described by Frédéric de Lafresnaye in 1834. The specific name pittoides is a reference to its resemblance to the pittas, an unrelated family of passerine birds.

Description
It has a cobalt-blue head with a black mask and a white  and throat, which is bordered in blue. The upperparts are bronzy green and the belly is white with buff flanks, and the breast and back have a rufous band.

Distribution and habitat
The pitta-like ground roller is endemic to the eastern half of Madagascar, from the extreme north to the southern edge, and has the widest distribution of any member of the family. It can also appear in smaller numbers in degraded secondary forest. It is generally non-migratory but changes in numbers linked to the weather have been noted so some undescribed movements may be happening.

Behaviour
The pitta-like ground roller is terrestrial and feeds on the ground, taking a range of prey, particularly insects such as ants, beetles, cockroaches and butterflies. It also takes worms and small reptiles such as chameleons and frogs. It hunts by standing motionless and watching, followed by short runs to take a new position. Once prey is located it sallies or runs towards it to take it.

The pitta-like ground roller is a seasonal breeder, with most activity happening between October and February. The female incubates the two to four shiny white eggs alone, although the male may feed her during the incubation period. Both parents feed the chicks.

References

pitta-like ground roller
pitta-like ground roller
Taxonomy articles created by Polbot
Taxa named by Frédéric de Lafresnaye